The 1874–75 Harvard Crimson football team represented Harvard University in the 1874 college football season. The team finished with a 1–1 record and was retroactively named co-national champion by Parke H. Davis. The team captain was Arthur B. Ellis.

After the first rugby football game in the United States was played by McGill University visiting Harvard in May 1874, Harvard traveled to Montreal for another rugby style game in October. No goals were scored, the game ended in a 0–0 tie, but Harvard had scored three tries to win the game in front of 2,000 spectators.

Schedule

References

Harvard
Harvard Crimson football seasons
College football national champions
Harvard Crimson football